Hotchkiss is a surname. Notable people with the surname include:

Avis Hotchkiss, early American motorcycle traveler with her daughter Effie
Benjamin B. Hotchkiss (1826–1885), 19th-century American engineer
 E.H. Hotchkiss, an inventor of the stapler 
Effie Hotchkiss, pioneering American motorcyclist with her mother Avis
George Hotchkiss (1906–1989), American professional basketball coach
George W. Hotchkiss (1831–1926), American businessman
Giles W. Hotchkiss (1815–1878), American politician
Harley Hotchkiss (1927–2011), Canadian businessman
Herman Hotchkiss (1765–1836), American settler
Jedediah Hotchkiss (1828–1899), cartographer for the Confederate Army during the American Civil War
Julius Hotchkiss (1810–1878), American politician
L. D. Hotchkiss (1893–1964), American journalist
Maria Bissell Hotchkiss (1827–1901), wife of Benjamin B. Hotchkiss and founder of The Hotchkiss School and Hotchkiss Library
Merritt Hotchkiss, Canadian politician
Ralf Hotchkiss, American inventor
Rollin Hotchkiss (1911–2004), American biochemist
Sylvester Hotchkiss, American architect
William Horace Hotchkiss (1864–?), American writer
William O. Hotchkiss (1878–1954), American geologist
William Hotchkiss III (born 1943), former commanding general of the Philippine Air Force
 W.R. Hotchkiss, founder of what would become the Deluxe Corporation

See also
Hotchkis